Wolves is the third full-length album by melodic death metal band Deadlock. It was released in 2007, and featured techno beats. The track "Code of Honor" was turned into their first music video.  They launched a tour in support of "Wolves" through Europe alongside Neaera and Maintain.

Track listing
All music by Sebastian Reichl, Tobias Graf and Sabine Weniger
All lyrics by Johannes Prem
 "World Domination" (intro) - 0:47
 "We Shall All Bleed" - 6:03
 "Code of Honor" - 4:26
 "Losers' Ballet" - 6:38
 "Dark Cell" - 4:23
 "Crown of Creation" - 4:50
 "End Begins" - 4:34
 "As Words to Bullets" - 3:43
 "Praeludium II" (instrumental) - 1:32
 "Bloodpact" - 5:51
 "To Where the Skies Are Blue" - 3:49
 "Code of Honor" (Clubremixxx) (limited edition only) - 4:28

Personnel 
 Johannes Prem - male/harsh vocals
 Sabine Weniger - female/clean vocals
 Sebastian Reichl - guitar
 Gert Rymen - guitar
 Thomas Huschka - bass
 Tobias Graf - drums

2007 albums
Deadlock (band) albums